Golin  is a village in the administrative district of Gmina Jasień, within Żary County, Lubusz Voivodeship, in western Poland.

References

Golin